Foralumab is a fully human monoclonal antibody that binds to CD3 epsilon. Also called TZLS-401, it is currently in clinical development by Tiziana Life Sciences for treatment of Crohn's disease and other autoimmune diseases. However foralumab did not show efficacy for Crohn's disease.

It is currently in clinical development by Tiziana Life Sciences for treatment of secondary progressive Multiple sclerosis.

References 

Monoclonal antibodies